Durga Bhumij is an Indian politician and member of the Indian National Congress. Bhumij was a member of the Assam Legislative Assembly from the Doom Dooma constituency in Tinsukia district in 2006 and 2016.

References 

Living people
Indian National Congress politicians from Assam
Assam MLAs 2006–2011
Assam MLAs 2016–2021
People from Tinsukia district
Bhumij people
Year of birth missing (living people)